"Mercy" is a song by English rock band Muse from their seventh album, Drones. It was released as the second single from the album on 18 May 2015.

Background
The song is part of a concept album about "the journey of a human, from their abandonment and loss of hope, to their indoctrination by the system to be a human drone, to their eventual defection from their oppressors". On the band's website, Matt Bellamy stated that "[t]he opening line of 'Mercy' - Help me I've fallen on the inside - is a reference to the protagonist knowing and recognising that they have lost something, they have lost themselves. This is where they realize they're being overcome by the dark forces that were introduced in 'Psycho.

Reception
Upon the album's release, the song was met with mixed reactions. Gigwise's Andrew Trendell praised the song as being "heartfelt" and "a pristine stadium gem". In his album review for Consequence of Sound, Collin Brennan, however, was less favourable, criticising that the song's "supposedly trenchant political commentary [is] negated by its almost palpable yearning to be played on commercial rock radio".

In his review of Drones, NME's Mark Beaumont described the song as "infectious electro-rock". Consequence of Sound's Collin Brennan called it an "anthem" reminiscent of "latter-day U2". In similar fashion, Gigwise's Andrew Trendell described the song as a "driving and pulsing piano-led arena power-anthem". Likening it to the music from the band's fourth album Black Holes And Revelations, he called the song a "close cousin to 'Starlight'[...], albeit with a rejuvenated energy and very forward-looking approach".

Music video
The music video was directed by Sing J. Lee and shot in Los Angeles. It opens to a clock ticking counting down, and flashing quick glimpses of other scenes, some from the rest of the video, including the main character escaping down a hallway, screaming at the camera and counting calendar days in vivid red lighting, as well as numerous images of a similarly lit flower. These brief images repeat throughout the video. Shots of the band performing on a large indoor stage with bright, dynamic lighting are spliced throughout between the story scenes. 
Two scientists are shown discussing design plans for a female android posted on a wall in their workplace. A woman sleeps in a bed with a monitor on her wrist and an electronic device placed around her head, with several doctors monitoring her through the glass wall, watching what appears to be a simulation being created for her through the device on a screen, and tapping a button marked "days to reset" on another as it counts down and cycles through the days of the week. The woman's sleep appears to be getting less restful from the simulation as she fidgets and begins breathing harder. She is shown walking out onto a rooftop and taking a transparent rake from one of the men escorting her, redrawing the lines in a large sand garden, and looking out at the city around them before she and two of the men go back inside. We see her in the same room and on the same bed as before, but without the electronic devices, leaning away from an unknown man with a somewhat frightened expression as he lifts her chin to look at him and then begins undressing himself. Shots are shown of her flipping through a journal with a loose note stuck into it, reading "you are stronger than you think." She goes up to the rooftop to draw in the sand again, only this time bumps into an exact duplicate of herself accompanied by two different men, as both women take a moment to stare at each other in shock. She is later seen laying in bed, again without the devices, appearing to contemplate the emotions of these recent encounters. She is then shown looking through the glass wall of a small room, filled with sixteen more of the duplicates, standing but deactivated. She places a new note in the journal atop the other, reading "look right. You are greater in numbers." On the last day before the reset, the version of her with the simulation device suddenly startles awake, tears off the device and snaps it in half before throwing a stack of books from the nightstand through the window and escaping. We see her weave through numerous people trying to catch her, the source of some of the shots spread through the rest of the video, before she locks herself in a small room, containing a "final reset" button which she presses. She steps up onto a platform that lays her on her back as she appears to deactivate, before we see every one of the sixteen other duplicates wake up.

Usage in media
"Mercy" was used in promotional spots and launch trailer for the video game Batman: Arkham Knight.

Charts

Weekly charts

Year-end charts

References

2015 singles
2015 songs
Muse (band) songs
Song recordings produced by Robert John "Mutt" Lange
Songs written by Matt Bellamy
Warner Records singles